Tacoma FD is an American sitcom that takes place in a firehouse in Tacoma, Washington. The series premiered on March 28, 2019, on truTV. The third season premiered on September 16, 2021. In November 2021, the series was renewed for a fourth season.

Premise
Tacoma FD takes place in a firehouse in Tacoma, Washington. Without many fires to extinguish (due to Tacoma being one of America's wettest cities), the firefighters are always ready to fight fires… but they end up tackling the less-glamorous elements of the job. Leading the firehouse crew are Chief Terry McConky and Captain Eddie Penisi."

Cast and characters
Kevin Heffernan as Chief Terry McConky
Steve Lemme as Captain Edward “Eddie” Caesar Penisi
Marcus Henderson as Granfield "Granny" Smith
Eugene Cordero as Andy Myawani
Gabriel Hogan as Ike Crystal
Hassie Harrison as Lucy McConky

Episodes
Tacoma FD's newest chief, Terry McConky, is under scrutiny by the city council to get serious about his station's ratings; Terry's crew puts his job in jeopardy by engaging in a ridiculous competition for a super "sawft" prize.

Series overview

Season 1 (2019)

Season 2 (2020)

Season 3 (2021)

Production

Development
On January 10, 2018, it was announced that truTV had given the production a pilot order. The series was created by Broken Lizard comedy troupe members Kevin Heffernan and Steve Lemme, who also executive produce alongside David Miner, Greg Walter, and Kyle Clark. Production companies involved with the series include 3 Arts Entertainment and Silverscreen Pictures. On May 9, 2018, it was announced that truTV had given the production a series order for a first season consisting of ten episodes. On February 11, 2019, it was announced that the series would premiere on March 28, 2019. truTV renewed the series for a second season on June 18, 2019, which premiered on March 26, 2020. On August 5, 2020, truTV renewed the series for a third season, which premiered on September 16, 2021. On November 3, 2021, truTV renewed the series for a fourth season.

Casting
Alongside the pilot order announcement, it was confirmed that Kevin Heffernan and Steve Lemme had been cast in the series' lead roles. On February 5, 2018, it was announced that Kirby Bliss Blanton, Marcus Henderson, Eugene Cordero, and Gabriel Hogan had joined the main cast of the pilot. On September 19, 2018, it was reported that Blanton's role had been recast with Hassie Harrison assuming the part of Lucy McConky.

Filming
Principal photography for the series' pilot was expected to begin in February 2018. Filming for the rest of season one began in late 2018.

Ratings

Season 1

Season 2

Season 3

References

External links

Rotten Tomatoes

2010s American sitcoms
2020s American sitcoms
2010s American workplace comedy television series
2020s American workplace comedy television series
2019 American television series debuts
English-language television shows
Television series about firefighting
TruTV original programming
Television series by 3 Arts Entertainment
Television series by A24
Broken Lizard
Television shows set in Washington (state)
Culture of Tacoma, Washington